Polyipnus surugaensis is a species of ray-finned fish in the genus Polyipnus. It lives in deep water environments in Suruga Bay.

References 

Sternoptychidae
Fish described in 1990
Fish of Japan